This article is about music-related events in 1871.

Events 
 March 29 – The Royal Albert Hall is opened in London incorporating a grand organ by Henry Willis & Sons, the world's largest at this time, on which Anton Bruckner gives a series of recitals.
 Autumn – Charles Gounod begins a stay with soprano Georgina Weldon and her husband in London.
 December 24 – Giuseppe Verdi's opera Aida premières at the Khedivial Opera House in Cairo.
 December 26 – The Victorian burlesque Thespis, first of the Gilbert and Sullivan light opera collaborations, premières at the Gaiety Theatre, London. It does modestly well, but the two composers will not again work together until 1875.
Asger Hamerik becomes musical director of the Peabody Institute in Baltimore, Maryland.

Published popular music 
 "The Blue and the Gray" by James W. Long
 "Good Bye, Liza Jane" (anon)
 "The Little Church Around The Corner"     w.m. Charles A. White
 "The Little Old Log Cabin In The Lane"  w.m. William S. Hays
 "Mollie Darling" w.m. William S. Hays
 "Oh aint I got the Blues!" by A.A. Chapman
 "Onward, Christian Soldiers"      w. Rev. Sabine Baring-Gould m. Sir Arthur Sullivan
 "Reuben and Rachel" w. Harry Birch m. William Gooch
 "Susan Jane"  w.m. William S. Hays
"The angels are calling me, Mother," words by Samuel N. Mitchell, music by William A. Huntley

Classical music 
Georges Bizet – Jeux d'enfants
Dudley Buck – Variations on a Scotch Air, Op.51
Hans von Bülow – Il Carnevale di Milano, Op.21
Peter Cornelius – Chorgesänge
Charles Gounod – Boléro, CG 354
Stephen Heller – Freischütz Studien, Op.127
Adolf Jensen – 12 Lieder aus Joseph Victor Scheffels Gaudeamus, Op.40
Jules Massenet 
Dialogue nocturne
Le roman d'Arlequin
Rêvons, c'est l'heure
Scènes hongroises, premiered November 26 in Paris
Karl Matys – 4 Solostücke, Op.15
Olivier Metra 
Espérance Waltz
La vague
Johann Rufinatscha 
6 Charakterstücke, Op.14
Fantasie in B major for piano, Op.15
Camille Saint-Saëns – Romance, Op. 37
Eduard Strauss – Fesche Geister, Op.75
Johann Strauss, Jr. 
Indigo-Quadrille, Op.344
Tausend und eine Nacht, Op.346
Arthur Sullivan – The Merchant of Venice, premiered November 19 in Manchester
Pyotr Ilyich Tchaikovsky – String Quartet No. 1 (Tchaikovsky)
Robert Volkmann – Overture to Shakespeare's Richard III, Op.68

Opera 
Giovanni Bottesini – Ali Baba
Jacques Offenbach – Boule de neige, premiered December 14 in Paris.
Johann Strauss Jr. – Indigo und die vierzig Räuber, premiered February 10 in Vienna.
Giuseppe Verdi –  Aida

Musical theatre 

 Geneviève de Brabant, London production
 The Mascot, London production
 La Mascotte, Vienna production
 Le Roi Carotte, London production
 Thespis, London production

Births 
 March 1 – Ben Harney, American composer and ragtime pianist (d. 1938)
 March 4 – Henri Delépine, composer (died 1956)
 March 8 – Gaston Borch, composer (died 1926)
 March 12 – Helene Wiet, Austrian opera singer (d. 1939)
 April 21 – Leo Blech, German conductor and composer (d. 1958)
 May 7 – Paolo Litta, Italian composer (d. 1931)
 May 30 – Harry Macdonough, Canadian-American singer and music executive (d. 1931)
 June 17 – James Weldon Johnson, African American songwriter, author, diplomat and educator (d. 1938)
 June 29 – Luisa Tetrazzini, Italian soprano (d. 1940)
 July 10 – Franz Evers, lyricist and music publisher (died 1947)
 August 1 – Oskar Fried, composer (died 1941)
 August 16 – Zacharia Paliashvili, Georgian composer (d. 1933)
 December 20 – Henry Kimball Hadley, American composer (d. 1937)

Deaths 
January 4 – Vincent Adler, pianist and composer (b. 1826)
February 1 – Alexander Serov, composer and music critic (b. 1820)
February 7 – Henry E. Steinway, German-American piano manufacturer (b. 1797)
February 11 – Filippo Taglioni, dancer and choreographer (b. 1777)
March 26 – François-Joseph Fétis, composer and musicologist (b. 1784)
April 27 – Sigismond Thalberg, pianist and composer (b. 1812)
May 12 – Daniel Auber, composer (born 1782)
May 26 – Aimé Maillart, composer (b. 1817)
July 17 – Karl Tausig, pianist and composer (b. 1841) (typhoid)
July 20 – François Delsarte, singer and music teacher (b. 1811)
August 12 – Tiyo Soga, composer of hymns (b. 1829)
September 3 – Václav Emanuel Horák, church musician and composer (b. 1800)
September 26 – Cipriani Potter, pianist and composer (b. 1792)
December 12 – Henrik Rung, composer (b. 1807)
date unknown
John Edward Pigot, music collector (b. 1822)
Fernando Quijano, songwriter, composer of the Uruguayan national anthem (b. 1805)

References 

 
19th century in music
Music by year